Tuomiojärvi is a lake in the city of Jyväskylä, Central Finland. The total size of the lake is 298 hectares and it has 7 islands. The average depth of the lake is 3.5 metres and the maximum depth is 13.1 metres. The lake has five official beach areas.

References 

Lakes of Jyväskylä